This is a list of United States municipalities, counties, neighborhoods, and tribal communities that have been designated as "Preserve America Communities" under the federal government's Preserve America program. As of 2017, more than 900 communities, representing all 50 states and two U.S. territories, had been so designated.

 Abbeville, South Carolina
 Aberdeen, South Dakota
 Abilene, Texas
 Adams County, Iowa
 Aiken, South Carolina
 Alameda, California
 Albany, New York
 Albany, Texas
 Albion, New York
 Alexandria, Virginia
 Alpena, Michigan
 Alpharetta, Georgia
 Alpine, Texas
 Ambridge, Pennsylvania
 American Samoa
 Americus, Georgia
 Anaconda-Deer Lodge, Montana
 Anacortes, Washington
 Anchorage, Alaska
 Anchorage, Kentucky
 Anderson, South Carolina
 Annapolis, Maryland
 Arcadia, Louisiana
 Ardmore, Oklahoma
 Arrow Rock, Missouri
 Asheboro, North Carolina
 Asheville, North Carolina
 Ashland, Kentucky
 Astoria, Oregon
 Atlanta, Texas
 Auburn, New York
 Augusta, Georgia
 Augusta, Kentucky
 Austin, Texas
 Baca County, Colorado
 Bainbridge Island, Washington
 Baldwyn, Mississippi
 Baltimore, Maryland
 Banner Elk, North Carolina
 Barbourville, Kentucky
 Bardstown, Kentucky
 Barre, Vermont
 Barrington, Rhode Island
 Bartlett, Tennessee
 Bastrop, Louisiana
 Bastrop, Texas
 Batesville, Arkansas
 Bath, Maine
 Baton Rouge, Louisiana
 Bay City, Michigan
 Bayfield, Wisconsin
 Beacon, New York
 Beaufort, North Carolina
 Beaufort, South Carolina
 Bedford, Indiana
 Bedford County, Pennsylvania
 Beekman, New York
 Bell Court neighborhood, Lexington, Kentucky
 Bellevue, Kentucky
 Bellingham, Washington
 Belton, Texas
 Benham, Kentucky
 Bennington, Vermont
 Bent County, Colorado
 Benton, Arkansas
 Bethlehem, Pennsylvania
 Beverly, West Virginia
 Biddeford, Maine
 Big Horn County, Montana
 Billings, Montana
 Biloxi, Mississippi
 Binghamton, New York
 Birmingham, Alabama
 Blackstone, Massachusetts
 Blairsville, Pennsylvania
 Bloomington, Indiana
 Blount County, Tennessee
 Blue Island, Illinois
 Bluffton, South Carolina
 Blytheville, Arkansas
 Blythewood, South Carolina
 Boise, Idaho
 Bonita Springs, Florida
 Boone, North Carolina
 Boone County, Kentucky
 Booneville, Arkansas
 Boonville, Missouri
 Bowling Green, Kentucky
 Bowling Green, Ohio
 Boyne City, Michigan
 Bozeman, Montana
 Bradford, Pennsylvania
 Bradford, Vermont
 Bramwell, West Virginia
 Brandon, Vermont
 Brattleboro, Vermont
 Breckenridge, Colorado
 Bridgeport, Connecticut
 Bridgeton, New Jersey
 Brigham City, Utah
 Bristol, Rhode Island
 Brockport, New York
 Brookhaven, New York
 Brookings, South Dakota
 Brownville, Nebraska
 Brownsville, Texas
 Bryan, Texas
 Buffalo, New York
 Burlington, North Carolina
 Burlington, Vermont
 Burrillville, Rhode Island
 Butte-Silver Bow, Montana
 Cadillac, Michigan
 Cadiz, Kentucky
 Caldwell, Idaho
 Calico Rock, Arkansas
 Calvert, Texas
 Calvert County, Maryland
 Camden, Arkansas
 Camden, Maine
 Camden, South Carolina
 Campbellsville, Kentucky
 Canandaigua, New York
 Canal Winchester, Ohio
 Canton, Mississippi
 Canton, Texas
 Canyon, Texas
 Cape Girardeau, Missouri
 Carlisle, Pennsylvania
 Carrollton, Kentucky
 Cartersville, Georgia
 Carthage, Missouri
 Carver, Minnesota
 Casper, Wyoming
 Castroville, Texas
 Cedarburg, Wisconsin
 Celina, Texas
 Centerville, Utah
 Central Falls, Rhode Island
 Chambersburg, Pennsylvania
 Charles County, Maryland
 Charles Town, West Virginia
 Charleston, South Carolina
 Charlotte Amalie, U.S. Virgin Islands
 Cheltenham Township, Pennsylvania
 Cheraw, South Carolina
 Chesterfield, South Carolina
 Chesterfield County, Virginia
 Cheyenne, Wyoming
 Chickasaw, Alabama
 Chinatown Historic District, Honolulu, Hawaii
 Chinatown, Los Angeles, California
 Christiansted, U.S. Virgin Islands
 Cincinnati, Ohio
 Clarksville, Texas
 Clayton, New York
 Cleveland, Mississippi
 Cleveland County, North Carolina
 Clinton, Missouri
 Cloverport, Kentucky
 Cobb County, Georgia
 Colchester, Connecticut
 College Park, Maryland
 Collierville, Tennessee
 Colorado City, Texas
 Colorado Springs, Colorado
 Columbia, South Carolina
 Columbia, Tennessee
 Columbia Borough, Pennsylvania
 Columbus, Mississippi
 Colusa, California
 Connellsville, Pennsylvania
 Conway, Arkansas
 Conway, South Carolina
 Coon Rapids, Iowa
 Coral Gables, Florida
 Corinth, Mississippi
 Cortland, New York
 Corvallis, Oregon
 Covington, Kentucky
 Cranston, Rhode Island
 Crawford County, Georgia
 Cripple Creek, Colorado
 Crosbyton, Texas
 Crowley, Louisiana
 Crowley County, Colorado
 Crown Point, Indiana
 Crow Tribe of Indians
 Cuero, Texas
 Cumberland, Kentucky
 Cumberland, Maryland
 Cumberland, Rhode Island
 Cynthiana, Kentucky
 Dahlonega, Georgia
 Dallas, Texas
 Dalton, Georgia
 Danville, Kentucky
 Darien, Georgia
 Davenport, Iowa
 Dawson Springs, Kentucky
 Dayton, Kentucky
 Dayton, Ohio
 Dayton, Washington
 Daytona Beach, Florida
 DeLand, Florida
 Delaware, Ohio
 Delray Beach, Florida
 Denton, Texas
 Denver, Colorado
 De Pere, Wisconsin
 DeRidder, Louisiana
 Dillon, South Carolina
 The District neighborhood, Nashville, Tennessee
 Dorchester County, Maryland
 Douglas, Massachusetts
 Douglas, Michigan
 Douglas, Wyoming
 Douglasville, Georgia
 Dover, Delaware
 Dover-Foxcroft, Maine
 Dubach, Louisiana
 Dubuque, Iowa
 Dumas, Arkansas
 Durant, Oklahoma
 Dunedin, Florida
 Durango, Colorado
 Durham Township, Pennsylvania
 Dutchess County, New York
 East Greenwich, Rhode Island
 Easton, Maryland
 Easton, Pennsylvania
 East Pikeland Township, Pennsylvania
 East Providence, Rhode Island
 Eau Claire, Wisconsin
 Edenton, North Carolina
 Edmonds, Washington
 El Dorado, Arkansas
 Electra, Texas
 Elk Grove, California
 Elkins, West Virginia
 Elizabethtown, Kentucky
 Elkhart, Indiana
 El Paso, Texas
 Enid, Oklahoma
 Enterprise, Oregon
 Erlanger, Kentucky
 Eureka Springs, Arkansas
 Evanston, Wyoming
 Excelsior Springs, Missouri
 Fairmont, West Virginia
 Falmouth, Massachusetts
 Fargo, North Dakota
 Farmersville, Texas
 Farmington, Maine
 Farmington, Utah
 Fauquier County, Virginia
 Fayetteville, Arkansas
 Fayetteville, Georgia
 Fayetteville, North Carolina
 Fernandina Beach, Florida
 Ferndale, Michigan
 Ferriday, Louisiana
 Ferry County, Washington
 Flagler County, Florida
 Flat Rock, Michigan
 Flemingsburg, Kentucky
 Florissant, Missouri
 Fond du Lac, Wisconsin
 Forsyth, Georgia
 Fort Benton, Montana
 Fort Collins, Colorado
 Fort Madison, Iowa
 Fort Myers, Florida
 Fort Pierre, South Dakota
 Fort Smith, Arkansas
 Fort Thomas, Kentucky
 Fort Valley, Georgia
 Fort Wayne, Indiana
 Fountain Inn, South Carolina
 Frankfort, Kentucky
 Franklin, Kentucky
 Franklin, Tennessee
 Frederick, Maryland
 Fredericksburg, Texas
 Frederiksted, U.S. Virgin Islands
 Fredericktown, Missouri
 Fremont County, Colorado
 Fremont County, Wyoming
 Fresno, California
 Frisco, Colorado
 Frisco, Texas
 Fullerton, California
 Gainesville, Florida
 Galveston, Texas
 Gardiner, Maine
 Gaston County, North Carolina
 Georgetown, Colorado
 Georgetown, Kentucky
 Georgetown, Ohio
 Georgetown, Texas
 George West, Texas
 German Village, Columbus, Ohio
 Gettysburg, Pennsylvania
 Giddings, Texas
 Gilpin County, Colorado
 Glasgow, Kentucky
 Glendale, Arizona
 Glenwood Springs, Colorado
 Glocester, Rhode Island
 Gloucester, Massachusetts
 Golden, Colorado
 Gonzales, Texas
 Grafton, Massachusetts
 Granbury, Texas
 Grand Rapids, Michigan
 Granville, Ohio
 Grapevine, Texas
 Gratz Park neighborhood, Lexington, Kentucky
 Gray Court, South Carolina
 Great Falls, Montana
 Great Neck Plaza, New York
 Greeley, Colorado
 Green Bay, Wisconsin
 Greendale, Wisconsin
 Green River, Wyoming
 Greensburg, Indiana
 Greensburg, Kentucky
 Greenville, Mississippi
 Greenville, North Carolina
 Greenville County, South Carolina
 Greenwood, Mississippi
 Hailey, Idaho
 Halfmoon, New York
 Hamburg, Arkansas
 Hanover, Pennsylvania
 Hanover County, Virginia
 Hardin County, Iowa
 Harlan, Kentucky
 Harlem, Georgia
 Harpers Ferry, West Virginia
 Harris County, Texas
 Harrisburg, Pennsylvania
 Harrisonburg, Virginia
 Harrodsburg, Kentucky
 Hart County, Kentucky
 Hartwell, Georgia
 Hatteras Village, North Carolina
 Hattiesburg, Mississippi
 Havre, Montana
 Hawkinsville, Georgia
 Hearne, Texas
 Hebron, Connecticut
 Helena, Arkansas
 Helena, Montana
 Hendersonville, North Carolina
 Hernando, Mississippi
 Herndon, Virginia
 Henderson, Kentucky
 Hidalgo, Texas
 Highland Falls, New York
 Hightstown, New Jersey
 Hill County, Montana
 Hillsborough, North Carolina
 Hillsville, Virginia
 Hinton, West Virginia
 Historic Filipinotown neighborhood, Los Angeles, California
 Historic Portland neighborhood, Louisville, Kentucky
 Hodgenville, Kentucky
 Holyoke, Massachusetts
 Hooksett, New Hampshire
 Hopedale, Massachusetts
 Hopkinsville, Kentucky
 Horry County, South Carolina
 Horse Cave, Kentucky
 Hot Springs, Arkansas
 Howard County, Maryland
 Hudson, Ohio
 Hunter, New York
 Huntsville, Alabama
 Huron Township, Michigan
 Independence, Missouri
 Independence, Oregon
 Ironbound community, Newark, New Jersey
 Irvington neighborhood, Indianapolis, Indiana, including Irvington Historic District and North Irvington Gardens Historic District
 Ithaca, New York
 Jackson, Wyoming
 Jacksonville, Florida
 Jacksonville, Oregon
 Japantown, San Francisco, California
 Jefferson, Georgia
 Jefferson City, Missouri
 Jefferson County, Montana
 Jeffersonville, Indiana
 Jonesborough, Tennessee
 Jones County, Georgia
 Juneau, Alaska
 Junius Heights neighborhood, Dallas, Texas
 Kalispell, Montana
 Kamiah, Idaho
 Kanab, Utah
 Kauai County, Hawaii
 Keene, New Hampshire
 Kendall County, Texas
 Kennesaw, Georgia
 Kerrville, Texas
 Ketchikan, Alaska
 Key West, Florida
 Kinderhook, New York
 King County, Washington
 Kinston, North Carolina
 Kiowa County, Colorado
 Kissimmee, Florida
 Koreatown neighborhood, Los Angeles, California
 Lac du Flambeau Band of Lake Superior Chippewa Indians (Wisconsin)
 Lafayette, Indiana
 Lafayette, Louisiana
 LaGrange, Georgia
 LaGrange, Kentucky
 Lake City, Colorado
 Lancaster, Pennsylvania
 Lancaster County, Pennsylvania
 Lancaster County, South Carolina
 Lansdowne, Pennsylvania
 La Porte, Indiana
 Laramie, Wyoming
 Laredo, Texas
 Las Vegas, Nevada
 Las Vegas, New Mexico
 Lawrence, Kansas
 Lawrenceburg, Kentucky
 Lead, South Dakota
 Leadville, Colorado
 Leavenworth, Kansas
 Lebanon, Kentucky
 Ledyard, Connecticut
 Leesburg, Virginia
 Leicester, Massachusetts
 Leland, Mississippi
 Lemont, Illinois
 Leon County, Florida
 Letcher County, Kentucky
 Lewes, Delaware
 Lewis and Clark County, Montana
 Lewiston, Maine
 Lewistown, Montana
 Liberty, Kentucky
 Liberty, Missouri
 Liberty, New York
 Lincoln, Nebraska
 Lincoln, Rhode Island
 Lincoln County, North Carolina
 Lincolnton, North Carolina
 Lipscomb County, Texas
 Litchfield, Minnesota
 Little Compton, Rhode Island
 Little Falls, Minnesota
 Little Italy, San Diego, California
 Little Rock, Arkansas
 Little Tokyo, Los Angeles, California
 Livermore, California
 Livingston, Montana
 Llano, Texas
 Lockport, Illinois
 Lodi, Wisconsin
 Logansport, Indiana
 London, Kentucky
 Lowell, Massachusetts
 Lower Merion Township, Pennsylvania
 Ludington, Michigan
 Luling, Texas
 Lynch, Kentucky
 Lynchburg, Virginia
 Mackay, Idaho
 Macon, Georgia
 Madison, Georgia
 Madison, Indiana
 Madisonville, Kentucky
 Mammoth Spring, Arkansas
 Mandeville, Louisiana
 Mannington, West Virginia
 Manteo, North Carolina
 Manti, Utah
 Marion, Iowa
 Marshall, Texas
 Martinsburg, West Virginia
 Marysville, Ohio
 Mason City, Iowa
 Matagorda County, Texas
 Matthews, North Carolina
 Maui County, Hawaii
 Maysville, Kentucky
 Mazomanie, Wisconsin
 McAllen, Texas
 McCormick, South Carolina
 McKinney, Texas
 Media, Pennsylvania
 Medina, Ohio
 Medora, North Dakota
 Mendocino, California
 Mendon, Massachusetts
 Menominee, Michigan
 Meridian, Mississippi
 Mesquite, Texas
 Miami, Florida
 Miami Springs, Florida
 Middlesborough, Kentucky
 Middleburg, Virginia
 Middlebury, Vermont
 Midway, Kentucky
 Milam County, Texas
 Miles City, Montana
 Millbury, Massachusetts
 Millville, Massachusetts
 Milton, Delaware
 Milton, Wisconsin
 Mineola, Texas
 Mineral Point, Wisconsin
 Minneapolis, Minnesota
 Missoula, Montana
 Missoula County, Montana
 Mobile, Alabama
 Moline, Illinois
 Monroe County, Indiana
 Monterey, California
 Monterey County, California
 Montezuma, Georgia
 Montezuma County, Colorado
 Montgomery County, Pennsylvania
 Monticello, Georgia
 Montpelier, Vermont
 Montrose, Colorado
 Morehead, Kentucky
 Morristown, Vermont
 Mount Pleasant, South Carolina
 Mount Pleasant, Utah
 Mount Sterling, Kentucky
 Mount Vernon, Kentucky
 Mount Vernon, Texas
 Muncie, Indiana
 Munfordville, Kentucky
 Murray, Kentucky
 Murray, Utah
 Muskogee, Oklahoma
 Nacogdoches, Texas
 Napa, California
 Nappanee, Indiana
 Natchez, Mississippi
 Natchitoches, Louisiana
 Nelsonville, Ohio
 New Albany, Indiana
 New Berlin, Wisconsin
 New Bern, North Carolina
 New Braunfels, Texas
 New Britain, Connecticut
 Newburgh, New York
 New Castle, Kentucky
 New Harmony, Indiana
 Newkirk, Oklahoma
 New London, Connecticut
 New Orleans, Louisiana
 Newport, Kentucky
 Newport, Rhode Island
 New Richmond, Ohio
 New Shoreham, Rhode Island
 Newton, New Jersey
 Newtown Borough, Pennsylvania
 Newtown Township, Pennsylvania
 New Ulm, Minnesota
 Nicholasville, Kentucky
 Noblesville, Indiana
 Nogales, Arizona
 Northbridge, Massachusetts
 North Castle, New York
 Northfield, Minnesota
 North Little Rock, Arkansas
 North Smithfield, Rhode Island
 Norwalk, Connecticut
 Oak Park, Illinois
 Oak Ridge, Tennessee
 Oakland, Maryland
 Oberlin, Ohio
 Ocean Springs, Mississippi
 Ocracoke, North Carolina
 Odessa, Texas
 Ogdensburg, New York
 Oklahoma City, Oklahoma
 Old Lyme, Connecticut
 Old West End Historic District, Toledo, Ohio
 Olmsted Falls, Ohio
 Ontario, California
 Opelousas, Louisiana
 Orange, Texas
 Orange Mound neighborhood, Memphis, Tennessee
 Oregon City, Oregon
 Osceola, Arkansas
 Osceola, Wisconsin
 Oskaloosa, Iowa
 Ossining, New York
 Otero County, Colorado
 Oxford, Mississippi
 Owego, New York
 Oyster Bay, New York
 Pacolet, South Carolina
 Paducah, Kentucky
 Pagosa Springs, Colorado
 Palestine, Illinois
 Palestine, Texas
 Palm Springs, California
 Palouse, Washington
 Paris, Kentucky
 Paris, Texas
 Park County, Colorado
 Pasadena, California
 Pascagoula, Mississippi
 Pawtucket, Rhode Island
 Payson, Utah
 Peekskill, New York
 Peoria, Arizona
 Perrysburg, Ohio
 Perryville, Kentucky
 Petersburg, Virginia
 Pharr, Texas
 Philadelphia, Pennsylvania
 Philipsburg Borough, Pennsylvania
 Phoenix, Arizona
 Pierce, Idaho
 Pierre, South Dakota
 Pikeville, Kentucky
 Pilot Point, Texas
 Pine Bluff, Arkansas
 Pineville, Kentucky
 Piqua, Ohio
 Pittman Center, Tennessee
 Pittsburg, Texas
 Pittsburgh, Pennsylvania
 Pittsford, New York
 Placerville, California
 Plainfield, Illinois
 Plano, Texas
 Plattsmouth, Nebraska
 Pleasant Grove, Utah
 Plymouth, Massachusetts
 Pocahontas, Arkansas
 Pompano Beach, Florida
 Ponca City, Oklahoma
 Port Gibson, Mississippi
 Portland, Maine
 Portsmouth, New Hampshire
 Port Townsend, Washington
 Pottstown, Pennsylvania
 Poultney, Vermont
 Prescott, Arizona
 Princeton, Kentucky
 Prince William County, Virginia
 Providence, Rhode Island
 Provo, Utah
 Prowers County, Colorado
 Pueblo, Colorado
 Purcellville, Virginia
 Putnam County, New York
 Pyramid Lake Paiute Tribe, Nevada
 Rabbit Hash, Kentucky
 Ramapo, New York
 Randolph County, Arkansas
 Raymond, Mississippi
 Redlands, California
 Redmond, Washington
 Red Lodge, Montana
 Redstone, Colorado
 Red Wing, Minnesota
 Redwood City, California
 Rensselaer County, New York
 Richfield, Wisconsin
 Richford, Vermont
 Richmond, California
 Richmond, Indiana
 Richmond, Kentucky
 Richmond Hill, Georgia
 Riley County, Kansas
 Rio Grande City, Texas
 Ripon, Wisconsin
 Ritzville, Washington
 Riverside, Illinois
 Roanoke, Virginia
 Roaring Springs, Texas
 Rocheport, Missouri
 Rochester, New York
 Rock Hill, South Carolina
 Rockingham, Vermont
 Rock Island, Illinois
 Rockland, Maine
 Rockland County, New York
 Rock Springs, Wyoming
 Rockville, Maryland
 Rockwall, Texas
 Roebling, New Jersey
 Rome, Georgia
 Roslyn, Washington
 Roswell, Georgia
 Roxbury, New York
 Rugby, Tennessee
 Russellville, Kentucky
 Rutland, Vermont
 Sabine County, Texas
 Sacramento, California
 Saco, Maine
 Saginaw, Michigan
 St. Augustine, Florida
 St. Albans, Vermont
 St. Charles, Missouri
 St. Cloud, Minnesota
 St. George Island, Alaska
 St. Johnsbury, Vermont
 St. Joseph County, Indiana
 St. Marys, Georgia
 St. Mary's County, Maryland
 St. Petersburg, Florida
 Ste. Genevieve, Missouri
 Salem, Massachusetts
 Salem, Oregon
 Salisbury, Maryland
 Salt Lake City, Utah
 Saltsburg, Pennsylvania
 San Angelo, Texas
 San Antonio, Texas
 San Clemente, California
 San Francisco, California
 San Juan Bautista, California
 San Marcos, Texas
 San Ramon, California
 Sandersville, Georgia
 Sanford, Florida
 Sanford, Maine
 Santa Ana, California
 Santa Barbara, California
 Santa Monica, California
 Santa Paula, California
 Santa Rosa, California
 Sarasota, Florida
 Saratoga Springs, New York
 Saugatuck, Michigan
 Sault Ste. Marie, Michigan
 Savannah, Georgia
 Schenectady County, New York
 Scott County, Virginia
 Scottdale, Pennsylvania
 Scottsdale, Arizona
 Scottsville, Kentucky
 Seguin, Texas
 Selma, Alabama
 Seward, Alaska
 Sharkey County, Mississippi
 Shawnee, Ohio
 Shawnee, Oklahoma
 Shelby, North Carolina
 Shelby Township, Michigan
 Shelbyville, Kentucky
 Shelter Island, New York
 Shiner, Texas
 Silver City, New Mexico
 Silverton, Colorado
 Simsbury, Connecticut
 Sioux City, Iowa
 Sioux Falls, South Dakota
 Sitka, Alaska
 Skowhegan, Maine
 Skykomish, Washington
 Slidell, Louisiana
 Smethport, Pennsylvania
 Smithfield, Rhode Island
 Smithfield, Virginia
 Smithville, Texas
 Snow Hill, Maryland
 Solvang, California
 Somerset, Ohio
 Sonoma, California
 Soulard, St. Louis, Missouri
 Southampton, New York
 South Bend, Indiana
 Southbury, Connecticut
 South Kingstown, Rhode Island
 Sparks, Nevada
 Sparta Township, Michigan
 Spokane, Washington
 Spotsylvania County, Virginia
 Springerville, Arizona
 Springfield, Kentucky
 Springfield, Massachusetts
 Stafford County, Virginia
 Stanford, Kentucky
 Steamboat Springs, Colorado
 Stevens County, Washington
 Stevensville, Montana
 Stillwater, Minnesota
 Stoughton, Wisconsin
 Strasburg, Virginia
 Suffield, Connecticut
 Suffolk, Virginia
 Sutton, Massachusetts
 Syracuse, New York
 Tallahassee, Florida
 Tampa, Florida
 Tarpon Springs, Florida
 Taylor, Texas
 Terry, Montana
 Teton County, Wyoming
 Texarkana, Arkansas
 Thai Town, Los Angeles, California
 Thomasville, Georgia
 Thomasville, North Carolina
 Tifton, Georgia
 Tipp City, Ohio
 Tiverton, Rhode Island
 Tombstone, Arizona
 Tooele County, Utah
 Transylvania County, North Carolina
 Tredyffrin Township, Pennsylvania
 Troy, New York
 Tucson, Arizona
 Tupelo, Mississippi
 Tulsa, Oklahoma
 Tuolumne County, California
 Tyler, Texas
 Tyronza, Arkansas
 Ukiah, California
 Upton, Massachusetts
 Uxbridge, Massachusetts
 Valdosta, Georgia
 Valley, Alabama
 Van Buren, Arkansas
 Vancouver, Washington
 Ventura, California
 Vergennes, Vermont
 Vermillion, South Dakota
 Versailles, Kentucky
 Vicksburg, Mississippi
 Victoria County, Texas
 Victorian Village neighborhood, Memphis, Tennessee
 Vienna, Georgia
 Virginia City, Montana
 Wabash, Indiana
 Wabasha, Minnesota
 Waco, Texas
 Walker County, Georgia
 Walker County, Texas
 Wall Township, New Jersey
 Walterboro, South Carolina
 Warren, Rhode Island
 Warrenton, Virginia
 Warsaw, Kentucky
 Warwick, Rhode Island
 Washington, D.C.
 Washington, Georgia
 Washington, Missouri
 Washington County, Pennsylvania
 Waterford, New York
 Waterford, Virginia
 Waterloo, Iowa
 Waukesha, Wisconsin
 Wausau, Wisconsin
 Waxahachie, Texas
 Waxhaw, North Carolina
 Waynesville, North Carolina
 Weaverville, California
 West Allis, Wisconsin
 West Chester, Pennsylvania
 Westerly, Rhode Island
 West Linn, Oregon
 West Main Street Preservation District, Louisville, Kentucky
 West Memphis, Arkansas
 West Palm Beach, Florida
 West Point, Kentucky
 West Salem Historic District, Winston-Salem, North Carolina
 Weston, Missouri
 Wethersfield, Connecticut
 Wheeling, West Virginia
 White Mountain Apache Tribe, Arizona
 White River Junction, Vermont
 Whitewater, Wisconsin
 Whitfield County, Georgia
 Wichita, Kansas
 Wilkes County, North Carolina
 Will County, Illinois
 Williams, Arizona
 Williamsburg, Virginia
 Wilmington, North Carolina
 Wimberley, Texas
 Winchester, Kentucky
 Winder, Georgia
 Windham, Connecticut
 Windsor, Colorado
 Windsor, Vermont
 Winnsboro, Texas
 Winooski, Vermont
 Woodbridge Township, New Jersey
 Woodstock, Illinois
 Woonsocket, Rhode Island
 Worcester, Massachusetts
 Worcester County, Maryland
 Wyandotte, Michigan
 York, Pennsylvania
 York County, South Carolina
 Yuma, Arizona

References

Heritage registers in the United States
Historic preservation in the United States
Lists of populated places in the United States
Lists of protected areas of the United States
United States history-related lists